Minnie Mary Lee was a pen name of Julia Amanda Sargent Wood (Sargent; after marriage, Wood; April 13, 1825 – March 9, 1903), a 19th-century American sentimental author, of poems, stories, sketches and novels, who sometimes also wrote as Mrs. Julia A. A. Wood. She began writing very early in life, but did not publish in book form until she was in her forties. The Heart of Myrrha Lake, Or, Into the Light of Catholicity (New York, about 1871; 2nd edition, 1873); Hubert's Wife: a Story for You (Baltimore, 1875); The Brown House at Duffield: a Story of Life without and within the Fold (Baltimore, 1877); and The Story of Annette and her Five Dolls: Told to dear little Catholic Children (Baltimore, 1880) were her published works. A convert to Roman Catholicism, Wood's novels were on Catholic themes.

Early life and education
Julia Amanda Sargent was born in New London, New Hampshire, April 13, 1825. She was a daughter of Ezekiel Sargent and his wife, Emily Everett Adams.

She was educated at the Colby Academy, and the Charlestown Female Seminary, Boston.

Career
Her parents removing to Covington, Kentucky, she was not long afterwards married to William Henry Wood, a practicing lawyer of Greensburg, Kentucky; this was in 1849. Two years later, they removed to Sauk Rapids, Minnesota, on the Mississippi River, being the capital and intellectual center of the commonwealth of Minnesota at that time. The following year, William received the appointment of government Land Receiver. William was a person of literary tastes and ability as a writer and orator. In 1860, the Woods edited a weekly newspaper called, The New Era. William died in 1870.

Wood was widely known by her pen name, "Minnie Mary Lee". She wrote serial tales and shorter stories for the Catholic Times and Opinion and for the Catholic Fireside, both published in Liverpool, England. Wood contributed generously to East Coast ladies' magazines like Arthur's and Godey's Lady's Book, and Jane Swisshelm's paper, The St. Cloud Visitor. She was at different times in editorial work, including with her son, conducting the Sauk Rapids Free Press.

Wood became a convert to the Roman Catholic faith, and wrote several novels more or less advocating the claims of that faith. Among them were The Heart of Myrrha Lake (New York City, 1872), Hubert's Wife (Baltimore, 1873), Brown House at Duffield (1874), Strayed from the Fold (1878), Story of Annette (1878), Three Times Three (1879), and From Error to Truth (New York, 1890). She served as postmaster of Sauk Rapids for four years under the Grover Cleveland administration.

Personal life
Wood did not support the movement for woman's rights and woman suffrage. She believed that woman should work towards suppression of the divorce laws.

Three of Wood's children lived to adulthood, including two sons, both of them journalists, and a daughter; her first-born child died at age three. She died in St. Cloud, Minnesota, March 9, 1903. Jeris Folk Cassel published a biography of her life in 1991.

Selected works

As Minnie Mary Lee
 The Heart of Myrrha Lake; or, Into the Light of Catholicity (New York, 1872)
 Hubert's Wife: a Story for You (Baltimore, 1875)
 The Brown House at Duffield: a Story of Life without and within the Fold (Baltimore, 1877)
 Strayed from the Fold : a story of life in the northwest, founded on facts (New York, 1878)
 The Story of Annette and her Five Dolls: Told to dear little Catholic Children (Baltimore, 1880)

As Mrs. Julia A. A. Wood
 Basil, Beatrice, Ethel, Or, Three-times-three, An Interesting Story of Real Life (1879)
 From Error to Truth (New York, 1890)

Notes

References

Attribution

Bibliography

External links
 
 

1825 births
1903 deaths
19th-century American poets
19th-century American women writers
19th-century American novelists
19th-century pseudonymous writers
American Roman Catholic poets
Poets from New Hampshire
People from New London, New Hampshire
American women novelists
Novelists from New Hampshire
People from Sauk Rapids, Minnesota
Poets from Minnesota
Novelists from Minnesota
Pseudonymous women writers
American autobiographers
Women autobiographers
American religious writers
Women religious writers
American Roman Catholic religious writers
People from St. Cloud, Minnesota
Wikipedia articles incorporating text from A Woman of the Century